The 1999 Mercedes-Benz Cup was a men's tennis tournament played on outdoor Hard at the Los Angeles Tennis Center in Los Angeles, United States that was part of the World Series of the 1999 ATP Tour. It was the 72nd edition of the tournament and was held from 26 July through 1 August 1999. Second-seeded Pete Sampras won the singles title, his second at the event after 1991, and earned $46,000 first-prize money.

Finals

Singles

 Pete Sampras defeated  Andre Agassi, 7–6(7–3), 7–6(7–1)
 It was Sampras's 3rd singles title of the year and the 59th of his career

Doubles

 Byron Black /  Wayne Ferreira defeated  Goran Ivanišević /  Brian MacPhie 6–2, 7–6(7–4)

See also
 Agassi–Sampras rivalry

References

External links
 ITF tournament edition details

Mercedes-Benz Cup
Los Angeles Open (tennis)
Mercedes-Benz Cup
Mercedes-Benz Cup
Mercedes-Benz Cup
Mercedes-Benz Cup